West Wind Shores is a small village in Plymouth, Massachusetts, United States. It is located south of Long Pond and north of Buzzards Bay, Whites Pond, Little Sandy Pond, Big Sandy Pond, and Ezekiel Pond. The village is built around several small ponds.

See also
 Neighborhoods in Plymouth, Massachusetts

Villages in Plymouth, Massachusetts
Villages in Massachusetts